Jan Močnik (born 27 March 1987) is a Slovenian professional basketball player.

Professional career
Močnik grew up in Nova Gorica, where he played for local team Nova Gorica in second national league of Slovenia.
He left Nova Gorica as loaned player in Kraški zidar in season 2003 and stayed there 3 years. Then he returned to Nova Gorica.

Union Olimpija
In season 2007/08 he sign with Slovenian League, Adriatic League and Euroleague club Union Olimpija for a 3 year contract. During the season 2007/08 winning the Slovenian League championship and cup with them. In Euroleague averaged 1.1 and 0.7 rebounds and also 1.3 assists in 11 games. His statistics in the Adriatic League were arguably more impressive, considering that he played 9 minutes per game in that competition in 20 games; he averaged 2.4 points and 0.2 rebounds. He also played on Slovenian league All-Star 2007. In the summer of 2012, he resigned a new contract with Union Olimpija.

On 19 December 2014 he signed with Helios Suns of the Telemach League until the end of season 2014-15.

On 3 January 2015 had Močnik 17 assists against Portorož, breaking Slovenian league single-game assists record (16, Daniel Vujasinović and Boris Jeršin). In 2014-15 season he averaged 12.8 points, 7.0 assists and 1.9 rebounds.

On 9 June 2015 Močnik signed new one-year deal with Helios.

On 4 November 2016 he signed with HKK Široki of the Bosnian League until the end of season 2016-17.

Two seasons (2017-2018 and 2018-2019) Močnik played in Czech top division team BK Olomoucko. He was starting five in first season, in which he finished with highest assists per game, 6.9.

On September 4, 2019 he signed a contract with Slovenian third division team KD Nova Gorica mladi.

International career
Močnik was a member of Slovenian U20 national team. He played at 2007 European Championship. He scored 9.3 points, made 5 assists in 8 games.

References

External links
 Euroleague profile
Profile at Adriatic League official site

1987 births
Living people
ABA League players
KK Olimpija players
People from Nova Gorica
Slovenian men's basketball players
KB Peja players
Point guards
Helios Suns players